Haval Abubakir (born January 1, 1971, in Halabja) is the current Governor of Sulaymaniyah Province. He took over as governor in 2017 and belongs to the Gorran political party. Abubakir was born in Halabja.

References

People from Sulaymaniyah
Kurdish politicians
1971 births
Living people
Governors of Sulaymaniyah Governorate